Tecophilaeaceae  is a family of flowering plants, placed in the order Asparagales of the monocots. It consists of nine genera with a total of 27 species.

The family has only recently been recognized by taxonomists. The APG IV system of 2016 (unchanged from the 1998, 2003, and 2009  versions) does recognize this family. The family then includes over half a dozen genera, with only a few dozen species, occurring in Africa, in western South America and western North America. This circumscription includes the genus Cyanastrum, which sometimes has been treated as a separate family Cyanastraceae.

Genera
The following genera are recognised:
Conanthera
Cyanastrum
Cyanella
Eremiolirion
Kabuyea
Odontostomum 
Tecophilaea
Walleria
Zephyra

References

External links
Tecophilaeaceae, Cyanastraceae in L. Watson and M.J. Dallwitz (1992 onwards). The families of flowering plants: descriptions, illustrations, identification, information retrieval. Version: Version: 27 April 2006. http://delta-intkey.com 
links at CSDL, Texas and more links at CSDL, Texas
Tecophilaeaceae of Chile, por Chileflora

 
Asparagales families